Gangadev is a Rural municipality located within the Rolpa District of the Lumbini Province of Nepal.
The rural municipality spans  of area, with a total population of 20,009 according to a 2011 Nepal census.

On March 10, 2017, the Government of Nepal restructured the local level bodies into 753 new local level structures.
The previous Jinawang, Rank, Pakhapani and portion of Wot VDCs were merged to form Gangadev Rural Municipality.
Gangadev is divided into 7 wards, with Jinawang declared the administrative center of the rural municipality.

Demographics
At the time of the 2011 Nepal census, Gangadev Rural Municipality had a population of 20,009. Of these, 99.1% spoke Nepali, 0.8% Magar and 0.1% other languages as their first language.

In terms of ethnicity/caste, 76.6% were Chhetri, 11.5% Magar, 7.2% Kami, 2.7% Damai/Dholi, 0.7% Thakuri, 0.5% Sarki, 0.4% Hill Brahmin, 0.2% Gurung, 0.1% Sanyasi/Dasnami and 0.1% others.

In terms of religion, 98.6% were Hindu, 0.7% Christian, 0.5% Buddhist and 0.2% others.

References

External links
official website of the rural municipality

Rural municipalities in Rolpa District
Rural municipalities of Nepal established in 2017